Roycroft was a reformist community of craft workers and artists which formed part of the Arts and Crafts movement in the United States. Elbert Hubbard founded the community in 1895, in the village of East Aurora, New York, near Buffalo. Participants were known as Roycrofters. The work and philosophy of the group, often referred to as the Roycroft movement, had a strong influence on the development of American architecture and design in the early 20th century.

History

The name "Roycroft" was chosen after the printers, Samuel and Thomas Roycroft, who made books in London from about 1650–1690. The word roycroft had a special significance to Elbert Hubbard. Hubbard believed "roycroft" meant "king's craft" in French. In guilds of early modern Europe, king's craftsmen were guild members who had achieved a high degree of skill and therefore made things for the King. The Roycroft insignia was borrowed from the monk Cassiodorus, a 13th-century bookbinder and illuminator.

Elbert Hubbard had been influenced by the ideas of William Morris on a visit to England. He was unable to find a publisher for his book Little Journeys, so inspired by Morris's Kelmscott Press, decided to set up his own private press to print the book himself, founding Roycroft Press.

His championing of the Arts and Crafts approach attracted a number of visiting craftspeople to East Aurora, and they formed a community of printers, furniture makers, metalsmiths, leathersmiths, and bookbinders. A quotation from John Ruskin formed the Roycroft "creed":

A belief in working with the head, hand and heart and mixing enough play with the work so that every task is pleasurable and makes for health and happiness.

The inspirational leadership of Hubbard attracted a group of almost 500 people by 1910, and millions more knew of him through his essay A Message to Garcia.

The Roycroft Press is also credited for publishing partner publications, such as Carl Lothar Bredemeier's The Buffalo Magazine for Arts in 1920.

In 1915 Hubbard and his wife, noted suffragist Alice Moore Hubbard, died in the sinking of RMS Lusitania, and the Roycroft community went into a gradual decline. Following Elbert's death, his son Bert took over the business. In attempts to keep his father's business afloat, Bert proposed selling Roycroft's furniture through major retailers. Sears & Roebuck eventually agreed to carry the furniture, but this was only a short lived success.

Fourteen original Roycroft buildings are located in the area of South Grove and Main Street in East Aurora. Known as the "Roycroft Campus", this rare survival of an art colony was awarded National Historic Landmark status in 1986.

The Elbert Hubbard Roycroft Museum, housed in the George and Gladys Scheidemantel House, in East Aurora is the main collection and research centre for the work of the Roycrofters.

Roycroft Inn

Part of the Roycroft Campus, the Inn is a hotel with a restaurant and lobby bar across the street from the primary buildings. It first opened for visitors in 1905 and in 1986, as part of the Roycroft Campus, became a National Historic Landmark. A nine year restoration was completed in 1995, with funding from the Margaret L. Wendt Foundation; the total cost was $8 million. At that time, the facility re-opened. The Salon area contains restored murals by Roycroft artist Alexis Jean Fournier.

Gallery

Famous Roycrofters
Arthur H. Cole, (1899-) coppersmith
Jerome Connor (1874–1943), sculptor of Elbert Hubbard statue, North Wind on the Roycroft Chapel, and others.
William Wallace Denslow (1856–1915), illustrator of The Wonderful Wizard of Oz.
Alexis Jean Fournier (1865–1948), American painter, including 20 murals at the Roycroft Inn.
William Joseph "Dard" Hunter (1883–1966), American authority on making paper by hand, as well as printing using handmade type.  He published a number of books on traditional, pre-industrial, techniques for making paper.
Walter Jennings, coppersmith and jeweler
Karl Kipp (1882-1954), worked in the bindery in 1908 and later established the Roycroft Copper Shop.
Fredrick Kranz, created find leather goods.
Victor Toothaker (1882-1932), coppersmith
Samuel Warner (1871-1947), book designer, artist and illustrator for many Roycroft books.

See also
 American craft
 Arden, Delaware
 Elbert Hubbard
 Frank Lloyd Wright
 Gustav Stickley
 Rose Valley, Pennsylvania
 Roy Croft

References

Further reading

 Cathers, David M. (1981) Furniture of the American Arts and Crafts Movement: Stickley and Roycroft Mission Oak New American Library, New York, 
 Champney, Freeman (1968) Art & glory; the story of Elbert Hubbard Crown Publishers, New York, OCLC 274494
 Hamilton, Charles Franklin (1973) As Bees in Honey Drown: Elbert Hubbard and the Roycrofters A.S. Barnes, South Brunswick, 
 Rust, Robert et al. (2000) The Roycroft Campus (Images of America series) Arcadia Publishing, Charleston, SC, 
 Turgeon, Kitty and Rust, Robert (1998) The Arts and Crafts Home Friedman/Fairfax Publishers, New York, 
 Via, Marie and Searl, Marjorie (eds.) (1994) Head, Heart, and Hand: Elbert Hubbard and the Roycrofters University of Rochester Press, Rochester, N.Y.,

External links

 Roycroft Organization
 Roycroft Inn, East Aurora
 Roycroft shop marks and related historical furniture maker details
 The Roycroft Community 1894-1938 by Hilary Davis
 The Arts & Crafts Movement: People: Elbert Hubbard
 The Roycroft Campus
 Roycrofters At Large Association
The Winterthur Library  Overview of an archival collection on the Roycrofters
Roycrofters Collection: Books published at the Roycrofter colony founded by Elbert Hubbard, (97 items). From the Rare Book and Special Collections Division at the Library of Congress
 Furniture Items from the 1906 Roycroft Catalog 

American artist groups and collectives
19th-century art groups
Arts and Crafts movement
History of Buffalo, New York
History of furniture
American furniture makers
1895 establishments in New York (state)
Populated places established in 1895
National Historic Landmarks in New York (state)
Buildings and structures in Erie County, New York
Tourist attractions in Erie County, New York
National Register of Historic Places in Erie County, New York